Mary Violet Leontyne Price (born February 10, 1927) is an American soprano who was the first African American soprano to receive international acclaim. From 1961 she began a long association with the Metropolitan Opera, where she was the first African American to be a leading performer. She regularly appeared at the world's major opera houses, including the Royal Opera House, San Francisco Opera, Lyric Opera of Chicago, and La Scala; at La Scala, she was also the first African American to sing a leading role. She was particularly renowned for her performances of the title role in Verdi's Aida.

Born in Laurel, Mississippi, Price attended Central State University and then Juilliard (graduating cum laude), where she had her operatic debut as Mistress Ford in Verdi’s Falstaff. Having heard the performance, Virgil Thomson engaged her in Four Saints in Three Acts, prior to embarking on her debut tour; she also starred (alongside her husband William Warfield) in a successful revival of Gershwin’s Porgy and Bess. Numerous concert performances followed, including a recital at the Library of Congress with composer Samuel Barber, on piano. Her 1955 televised performance of Puccini’s Tosca, plus appearances at the San Francisco Opera as Poulenc’s Dialogues des Carmélites and Aida, brought her to international attention. She went on to sing at many of the world's major opera houses with Aida, before her successful debut at the Metropolitan Opera (Met) in 1961, as Leonora in Verdi's Il trovatore. Continuing her career there, she starred in a multitude of operas for 20 years, securing her place among the leading performers of the century. One of these works was Barber's Antony and Cleopatra, which she starred in for its world premiere. She made her farewell opera performance at the Met in 1985 in Aida.

A lirico spinto (Italian for "pushed lyric") soprano, her musical interpretations were subtle but often overshadowed her acting. She was noted for her roles in operas by Mozart and Puccini, as well as playing Cleopatra in Handel's Giulio Cesare and Poppea in Monteverdi's L'incoronazione di Poppea. However, the "middle period" operas of Giuseppe Verdi remain her greatest triumph; Aida, the Leonoras of Il trovatore and La forza del destino, as well as Amelia in Un ballo in maschera. Her performances in these works, as well as Mozart and Puccini's operas, survive in her many recordings.

After her retirement from opera, Price continued to appear in recitals and orchestral concerts until 1997. After that, she would come out of retirement to sing at special events, including a memorial concert for victims of the 9/11 terrorist attacks at Carnegie Hall, in 2001. Among her many honors and awards are the Presidential Medal of Freedom in 1964, in addition to her 19 Grammy Awards.

Life and career

Youth and schooling
Mary Violet Leontyne Price was born in Laurel, Mississippi on February 10, 1927. Her father James Anthony worked as a carpenter and her mother Katherine Baker Price was a midwife. A deeply religious family, both of her parents were children of Methodist ministers; her mother sang as a soloist in the church choir and her father played a tuba in the church band. Her brother and only sibling, George, was born two years later. She showed a natural affinity for music at an early age and began piano lessons at the age of three and a half with the local pianist Hattie McInnis. Initially, she played on a toy piano, but by the time she was five, her parents traded in the family phonograph as the down payment on an upright piano. Meanwhile, at age eight, she had begun visiting the home of Alexander and Elizabeth Chisholm, a wealthy white family for whom Leontyne's aunt worked as a laundress. Leontyne and George became good friends with the Chisholms' older daughters, Jean and Peggy, and Mrs. Chisholm encouraged Leontyne's piano-playing and singing, often inviting her to sing at house parties. Aged 9, she was taken on a school trip to hear Marian Anderson sing a recital in Jackson. The experience was her first significant exposure to classical music, and she later recalled that "The whole aura of the occasion had a tremendous effect on me, particularly the singer's dignity and, of course, her voice". Multiple commentators asserted that this event galvanized Price's interest in a musical career. In her teen years, Price attended Oak Park Vocational High School, where she was a cheerleader and salutatorian. She earned extra money by singing for funerals and civic functions.

Mississippi was highly segregated at the time, and subject to Jim Crow laws. As such, as a black woman, the only evident musical career path was as a teacher. She began her study in music education at Central State University, a historically black school in Wilberforce, Ohio. However, on the advice of the university president and after frequent singing in a glee club she changed her major to voice in her third year. She also participated in master classes, including one in 1948 with the renowned bass Paul Robeson at Antioch College. Robeson was impressed by Price's voice, and—knowing she was aiming to enroll at Juilliard—worked with the Central State administrators to host a benefit concert to help raise money for her tuition. The Chisholms also remained supportive of Price, and gifted the bulk of the money needed for Juilliard.

She entered the studio of Florence Page Kimball in the fall of 1948. She lived in the Harlem YWCA while studying at the Juilliard that year, which was safe and affordable accommodation open to black women. In her second year, she heard Ljuba Welitsch sing Salome from the standing-room section at the Met and became fascinated by opera. In fall 1950, Price joined Juilliard's Opera Workshop and sang small roles in workshop performances of Mozart's Magic Flute (First Lady)  and Puccini's Gianni Schicchi (Aunt Nella). In the summer of 1951, she enrolled in the opera program at the Berkshire Music Center at Tanglewood and sang Ariadne in Strauss' Ariadne auf Naxos (second cast).

Early career
In early 1952, Price performed as Mistress Ford in a Juilliard production of Verdi's Falstaff. Virgil Thomson heard a performance and cast her in a revival of his all-black opera, Four Saints in Three Acts. After two weeks on Broadway, the production of Saints went to Paris. Meanwhile, Price had been signed to sing Bess in a new production of Gershwin's Porgy and Bess at the Ziegfeld Theatre, directed by Robert Breen.

Fresh off the plane from Paris, she sang the opening performance of Porgy and Bess at the State Fair of Texas on June 9, 1952, receiving rave reviews. The production played in Pittsburgh, Chicago and Washington, D.C., and then toured Vienna, Berlin, London, and Paris, under the auspices of the U.S. State Department.

On the eve of the European tour, Price married William Warfield, her Porgy and a noted bass-baritone concert singer. The ceremony took place at the Abyssinian Baptist Church in Harlem, with many in the cast in attendance.

Although many black newspapers criticized the export of Porgy and Bess as presenting a false and demeaning picture of black life, the Breen production showed off a new generation of highly trained black singers, and affirmed that Americans could revive a musical masterpiece while recognizing its outdated stereotypes. Many East Berliners crossed to West Berlin to see the show.

When Porgy and Bess returned to the States in 1953, Warfield was unable to adjust a busy recital and concert schedule and was dropped from the cast, while Price sang Bess for another year, on Broadway and a second US tour. Warfield said the episode put a strain on their young marriage. The couple was legally separated in 1967, and divorced in 1973. They had no children.

Price and Warfield both dreamt of careers in opera, but racial barriers limited  opportunities for black singers. The New York City Center Opera under Laszlo Halasz had hired the first black singers in leading roles in the mid-1940s, starting with Camilla Williams and Todd Duncan. In 1949, the new general manager of the Metropolitan Opera, Rudolf Bing, had said publicly he would cast Negro singers "for the right part".

The Metropolitan Opera recognized Price's potential by inviting her to sing "Summertime" at a "Met Jamboree" fund-raiser on April 6, 1953, at the Ritz Theater on Broadway. Price was thus the first African American to sing with and for the Met, if not at the Met as a member of the company. That distinction went to Marian Anderson, who sang Ulrica in Verdi's Un ballo in maschera on January 7, 1955. Price and Warfield were in the audience.

While awaiting a chance to sing in opera, Price sang duo concerts with Warfield, and, after leaving Porgy and Bess, began a concert career for Columbia Artists. In 1953, she sang a recital at the Library of Congress, with composer Samuel Barber at the piano. The program included the world premiere of Barber's Hermit Songs. In November 1954, Price made her formal recital debut at New York's Town Hall.

Emergence

The door to opera opened through the young medium of television and the NBC Opera Theatre, with music director Peter Herman Adler. In January 1955, Price sang the title role in Puccini's Tosca, the first appearance by an African American in a leading role in televised opera. (Another black soprano, Veronica Tyler, had sung in the NBC Opera chorus for several seasons.) Price went on to star in three other NBC Opera broadcasts, as Pamina in Mozart's The Magic Flute in 1956, as Madame Lidoine in Poulenc's Dialogues of the Carmelites the following years, and as Donna Anna in Mozart's Don Giovanni in 1960. Tosca was not controversial. Price's appearance had not been widely advertised by NBC, which had a policy of "integration without identification," and the Jackson, Mississippi, NBC affiliate carried the broadcast signal to her home town of Laurel. However, Jet magazine noted that her appearance with tenor David Poleri, the Cavaradossi, marked a first TV broadcast with a mixed-racial couple, and her later NBC Opera broadcasts were boycotted by several NBC affiliates, most of them in the South, because of her race.

In March 1955, Price was taken by her agent to audition at Carnegie Hall for the young Austrian conductor Herbert von Karajan, who was touring with the Berlin Philharmonic. Impressed with her singing of "Pace, pace, mio Dio" from Verdi's La forza del destino, Karajan reportedly leapt to the stage to accompany Price himself. Declaring her "an artist of the future", he asked to direct her future European operatic career.

After a successful Town Hall recital debut in November 1954, Price began touring the U.S. and Canada in recitals on the Columbia Artists roster, at first with the composer John La Montaine as her accompanist and then with David Garvey, who remained her pianistic partner until his death. In 1956, she and Garvey toured India and then, the next year, Australia, giving concerts and recitals for the U.S. State Department. On May 3, 1957, she performed Verdi's Aida in a concert performance with the Philadelphia Orchestra at the May Festival in Ann Arbor, Michigan, her first public performance of what became her signature role.

Her first performance at a major opera house was at the San Francisco Opera on September 20, 1957, as Madame Lidoine in the U.S. premiere of Dialogues of the Carmelites. A few weeks later, she appeared as Aida on stage, substituting at the last minute for Antonietta Stella, who had suffered an appendicitis. Price's European opera debut came in May 1958, again as Aida, at the Vienna State Opera with Karajan conducting. This was followed by performances of the role at the Royal Opera House in London (replacing Anita Cerquetti), and at the Arena di Verona.

The next fall, she appeared as Leonora in Verdi's Il Trovatore in San Francisco, with the Swedish tenor Jussi Björling. Then, returning to Vienna, she sang Aida and her first onstage Pamina. She gave a BBC television recital of American songs with Gerald Moore, and a concert of operatic scenes by Richard Strauss for BBC Radio, conducted by Adler. In Vienna, she made her first full opera recording for RCA, singing Donna Elvira in Mozart's Don Giovanni, conductd by Erich Leinsdorf.

That summer, she made her debut at the Salzburg Festival in Beethoven's Missa solemnis, conducted by Karajan; recorded a second full opera, Il Trovatore, for RCA in Rome; then returned to Verona to sing Il Trovatore with tenor Franco Corelli. Rudolf Bing was at one of the performances, and went backstage to invite Price and Corelli to make their Met debuts in the 1960–61 season.

That fall, Price made her Chicago Lyric Opera debut as Liu in Puccini's Turandot with Birgit Nilsson in the title role, and sang Massenet's Thaïs. Her Liu was well received while her Thaïs was considered stiff and mannered. On May 21, 1960, she sang for the first time at La Scala in Milan, again as Aida. The reception was tumultuous, and a Milanese critic wrote that "our great Verdi would have found her the ideal Aida". She was the first African American to sing a prima donna role in Italy's greatest opera house. (The African American soprano Mattiwilda Dobbs had sung there two years earlier, in the seconda role of Elvira in Rossini's L'Italiana in Algeri.) In Salzburg that summer, Price sang her first Donna Anna in Don Giovanni, again with Karajan. She then returned to Vienna to appear first as Cio-Cio-San, Puccini's Madama Butterfly.

Metropolitan Opera

When Bing had invited Price in 1958 to sing Aida at the Metropolitan Opera, she turned him down on the advice of Adler and others, who argued that she should wait until she had more repertoire under her belt. Adler warned against arriving in the racially stereotypical role of Aida, an Ethiopian slave. In his autobiography, Warfield quotes Adler as saying, "Leontyne is to be a great artist. When she makes her debut at the Met, she must do it as a lady, not a slave." Eventually, the Metropolitan booked her for five roles in early 1961, Leonora in Il Trovatore for her debut, Aida, Donna Anna, Liu, and Butterfly.

On January 27, 1961, Price and Corelli made a triumphant joint debut in Il Trovatore. The performance ended with an ovation that lasted at least 35 minutes, one of the longest in Met history. (Price said friends had timed it at 42 minutes, and that was the figure she used in her publicity.) In his review, New York Times critic Harold C. Schonberg wrote that Price's "voice, warm and luscious, has enough volume to fill the house with ease, and she has a good technique to back up the voice itself. She even took the trills as written, and nothing in the part as Verdi wrote it gave her the least bit of trouble. She moves well and is a competent actress. But no soprano makes a career of acting. Voice is what counts, and voice is what Miss Price has."

Reviewers were less enthusiastic about Corelli, who was disappointed and told Bing the next day he would never sing with Price again. The outburst was soon forgotten, and Price and Corelli sang together often, at the Met, the Vienna State Opera, in Salzburg, and (once, for Karajan's version of Bizet's Carmen) in the recording studio. In recognition of her extraordinary first season at the Metropolitan Opera, Time magazine put her on its cover, and ran a profile under the headline, "A voice like a banner flying".

Price had achieved an eminence no other African American had reached in opera. After Anderson, three black artists had preceded Price in leading roles at the Met: baritone Robert McFerrin (1955), soprano Gloria Davy (1956), and soprano Mattiwilda Dobbs (1958). However, Price was the first prima donna and box office star, and the first to open a season. The opening almost didn't happen. In September 1961, a musicians' strike threatened to abort the season, and Secretary of Labor Arthur Goldberg was asked to mediate a settlement. Price received enthusiastic reviews for the opening performance, but during the second performance, she confronted her first vocal crisis. In the middle of the second act, her voice slowly vanished until she was shouting the words at end of the scene. The standby, soprano Dorothy Kirsten, finished the performance. The newspapers said that Price was suffering a viral infection, but stress and the unsuitable weight of the role played their parts.

After several weeks off, Price repeated Puccini's La fanciulla del West and then, after a Butterfly in December, which she ended in tears, took a respite in Rome. The official word was that she had never fully recovered from the earlier virus. However, Price later said she was suffering from nervous exhaustion. In April, she returned to New York for her first Tosca and then joined the spring tour for the first time in Tosca, Butterfly, and Fanciulla. Recognizing that Price's talent was so extraordinary she would have to be included on the tour, creating problems in the segregated South, Bing had declared that the Met would no longer perform to segregated houses, starting in 1962. Price gave the first performance by an African American in a leading role with the company in the South, singing Fanciulla in Dallas. Two years later, she sang Donna Anna in Atlanta, a first leading role for an African American on tour in the Deep South. Both performances occurred without incident.

Consistently a box office sell-out in the early years, Price was soon earning a top fee. By 1964, she was paid was $2,750 per performance, on a par with Joan Sutherland, Maria Callas, and Renata Tebaldi, according to the Met archives. Birgit Nilsson, who was unique in singing both Italian and Wagnerian roles, earned a little more, at $3,000 a performance.

Price remained active in Vienna, Milan, and Salzburg. She sang a famous Il Trovatore in Salzburg, and Tosca and Donna Anna in Vienna, all with Karajan. She was also the soprano soloist in many of Karajan's performances of Verdi's Requiem.

After the first season, Price added seven roles to her repertoire there over the next five years: Elvira in Verdi's Ernani, Pamina, Fiordiligi in Mozart's Così fan tutte, Tatyana in Tchaikovsky's Eugene Onegin, Amelia in Un ballo in maschera, Cleopatra in Barber's Antony and Cleopatra, and Leonora in La forza del destino.

Antony and Cleopatra

The probably biggest and certainly most troubled milestone in her career was the opening night of the new Metropolitan Opera House at Lincoln Center on September 16, 1966, when she sang Cleopatra in Barber's Antony and Cleopatra, a new opera commissioned for the occasion. The composer had written the role especially for Price, often visiting her at home with new pages of the score.

In reviews of the premiere, Price's singing was highly praised. However, the opera was considered a failure by many critics, who found the sequence confusing, the Shakespearean text unintelligible, and director Franco Zeffirelli's production suffocatingly elaborate. Zeffirelli buried Barber's essentially intimate score under giant scenery, innumerable supernumeraries, and two camels. Bing had overreached, too, by scheduling three new productions in the first week in the new house, placing a burden on tech crews who had not yet mastered the equipment and lighting. The chaos of the final rehearsals, along with excerpts of Price's beautiful singing, were captured by cinema verite director Robert Drew in a Bell Telephone Hour documentary, titled "The New Met: Countdown to Curtain". Price later said the experience soured her feelings toward the Met. She began to appear there less often.

Antony and Cleopatra was never revived at the house. Barber prepared a concert suite of Cleopatra's arias, which was premiered by Price in Washington, DC, in 1968, and recorded for RCA.

Late opera career

In the late 1960s, Price cut back her operatic performances and devoted more of her career to recitals and concerts. She said she was tired, stressed by the racial tensions in the country and her role as a token of racial progress, and frustrated with the number and quality of new productions at the Met. Her recitals and concerts (generally programs of arias with orchestra) were highly successful, and, for the next two decades, she was a mainstay in the major orchestral and concert series in the big American cities and universities.

She knew to keep a presence in opera and returned to the Met and the San Francisco Opera, her favorite house, for short runs of three to five performances, sometimes a year or more apart. However, she undertook only three new roles after 1970: Giorgetta in Puccini's Il tabarro  in San Francisco; Puccini's Manon Lescaut, in San Francisco and New York; and the title role in Ariadne auf Naxos, also in San Francisco and New York. Of these, only Ariadne was considered as superlative as her established repertoire.

In October 1973, she returned to the Met to sing Madama Butterfly for the first time in a decade. In 1976, she was given a long-promised new production of Aida, with James McCracken as Radames and Marilyn Horne as Amneris, directed by John Dexter. The following season, she renewed her partnership with Karajan in a performance of Brahms' Ein deutsches Requiem with the Berlin Philharmonic at Carnegie Hall. She appeared more rarely in Europe. In the early 1970s, she sang Aida and a single Forza in Hamburg and returned to London's Covent Garden in Trovatore and Aida. She sang more often in recitals, in Hamburg, Vienna, Paris, and at the Salzburg Festival. At the latter she became a special favorite, appearing there in 1975, 1977, 1978, 1980, 1981, and 1984. 
 
In the U.S., she had become an iconic figure and was regularly asked to sing on important national occasions. In January 1973, she sang "Precious Lord, Take My Hand" and "Onward, Christian Soldiers" at the state funeral of President Lyndon B. Johnson. (She had sung at his inauguration in 1965.) President Jimmy Carter invited her to sing at the White House for the visit of Pope John Paul II and at the state dinner after the signing of the Camp David Peace Accords. In 1978, Carter invited her to sing a nationally televised recital from the East Room of the White House. In 1982, she sang "Battle Hymn of the Republic" before a Joint Meeting of Congress on the 100th anniversary of the birth of President Franklin Roosevelt. In fall 1986, Price sang the national anthem backed by the Los Angeles Philharmonic on Orange County Performing Arts Center's opening. Price also sang for Presidents Reagan, George H. W. Bush, and Clinton.

In 1977, she made nostalgic returns to Vienna and Salzburg in Il trovatore, in the famous production from 1962, once again under Karajan. The Vienna performances were the first for both at the State Opera since 1964, when Karajan had resigned as its director.

That fall, Price sang her last new role, and her first Strauss heroine: Ariadne in Ariadne auf Naxos The premiere in San Francisco was considered a great success. When she sang the role at the Met in 1979, she was suffering from a viral infection and had to cancel all but the first and last of eight scheduled performances. Reviewing the first performance, the New York Times critic John Rockwell was not complimentary.

In the fall of 1981, she had a late triumph in San Francisco when she stepped in for an ailing Margaret Price as Aida, a role she had not sung since 1976. The Radames was Luciano Pavarotti, in his first assumption of the role. Herbert Caen of the San Francisco Chronicle reported that Price had insisted on being paid $1 more than the tenor. That would have made her, for the moment, the highest-paid opera singer in the world. The opera house denied the arrangement.

In 1982, Price returned to the Met as Leonora in Il Trovatore, a role she hadn't sung in the house since 1969. She also sang a televised concert of duets and arias with Marilyn Horne and conductor James Levine, later released on record by RCA. In 1983, she hosted two televised performances of "In Performance from the White House," with President Ronald and Nancy Reagan, and sang the Ballo duet with Pavarotti in the 100th anniversary concert of the Metropolitan Opera.

She had considered her 1982 Met appearances her unannounced final opera performances, but the Met persuaded her to return for several Forza in 1984 and a series of "Aida" in 1984–1985. Performances of both operas were broadcast in the "Live from the Met" TV series on PBS, her first and only appearances in the series and important documents of two of her greatest roles.  Shortly before the last Aida, on January 3, 1985, word leaked to the press that it was to be her operatic farewell. The performance ended with 25 minutes of applause and the singer's photograph on the front page of the New York Times. The paper's critic Donal Henahan wrote that the "57-year-old soprano took an act or two to warm to her work, but what she delivered in the Nile Scene turned out to be well worth the wait." In 2007, PBS viewers voted her singing of the Act III aria, "O patria mia", as the No. 1 "Great Moment" in 30 years of "Live from the Met" telecasts. One critic described Price's voice as "vibrant," "soaring" and "a Price beyond pearls". Time magazine called her voice "Rich, supple and shining, it was in its prime capable of effortless soaring from a smoky mezzo to the pure soprano gold of a perfectly spun high C."

In 21 seasons with the Met, Price sang 201 performances, in 16 roles, in the house and on tour. After her debut in 1961, she was absent for three seasons—1970–71, 1977–78, and 1980–81; and sang only in galas in 1972–73, 1979–80, and 1982–83.

Post-operatic career

For the next dozen years, Price continued to perform concerts and recitals in the U.S.  Her recital programs, arranged by her longtime accompanist David Garvey, usually combined Handel arias or arie antiche, Lieder by Schumann and Joseph Marx, an operatic aria or two, followed by French melodies, a group of American art songs by Barber, Ned Rorem, and Lee Hoiby, and spirituals. She liked to end her encores with "This Little Light of Mine", which she said was her mother's favorite spiritual.

Over time, Price's voice became darker and heavier, but the upper register held up extraordinarily well and her conviction and sheer delight in singing always spilled over the footlights. On November 19, 1997, she sang a recital at the University of North Carolina at Chapel Hill that was her unannounced last.

In her later years, Price gave master classes at Juilliard and other schools. In 1997, at the suggestion of RCA Victor, she wrote a children's book version of Aida, which became the basis for the hit Broadway musical by Elton John and Tim Rice in 2000.

Price avoided the term African American, preferring to call herself an American, even a "chauvinistic American". She summed up her philosophy thus: "If you are going to think black, think positive about it. Don't think down on it, or think it is something in your way. And this way, when you really do want to stretch out, and express how beautiful black is, everybody will hear you."

On September 30, 2001, at the age of 74, Price was asked to come out of retirement to sing in a memorial concert at Carnegie Hall for the victims of the September 11 attacks. With Levine at the piano, she sang a favorite spiritual, "This Little Light of Mine", followed by an unaccompanied "God Bless America", ending it with a bright, easy high B-flat.

In 2017, the age of 90, Price appeared in Susan Froemke's The Opera House, a documentary about the opening of the new Metropolitan Opera House in Lincoln Center in 1966.

Awards
Among her many honors and awards are the Presidential Medal of Freedom (1964), the Spingarn Medal (1965), the Kennedy Center Honors (1980), the National Medal of Arts (1985), the Golden Plate Award of the American Academy of Achievement (1986), numerous honorary degrees, and 13 Grammy Awards for operatic and song recitals and full operas, and a Lifetime Achievement Award, more than any other classical singer. In October 2008, she was among the first recipients of the Opera Honors by the National Endowment for the Arts. In 2019, Leontyne Price was awarded an honorary doctorate degree from Boston Conservatory at Berklee.

Recordings

Most of Price's many commercial recordings were made by RCA Victor Red Seal and include three complete recordings of Verdi's Il trovatore (the final one for EMI), two of La forza del destino, two of Aida, two of Verdi's Requiem, two of Puccini's Tosca, and one each of Verdi's Ernani and Un ballo in maschera, Bizet's Carmen, Puccini's Madama Butterfly and Il tabarro, Mozart's Cosí fan tutte and Don Giovanni (as Donna Elvira), and R. Strauss' Ariadne auf Naxos, her final complete opera recording. She also recorded a disc of highlights from Porgy and Bess, with William Warfield as Porgy, conducted by Skitch Henderson, with Price singing the music all three female leads.

Her most popular aria collection is her first, titled Leontyne Price, a selection of Verdi and Puccini arias released by RCA Victor in 1961 and often referred to as the "Blue Album" for its light blue cover. It has been continuously in print, and is available on CD and SACD. Equally enduring is an album of Christmas music she recorded in 1961 with Karajan and the Vienna Philharmonic.

Her five "Prima Donna" albums, recorded from 1965 and 1979, are an exceptional survey of operatic arias for soprano, mostly from roles Price never performed on stage. They are available in a boxed set of her complete RCA recital albums. She also recorded two albums of Richard Strauss arias, an album of French and German art songs, a Schumann song album, two albums of Spirituals, a single crossover disc, "Right as the Rain," with André Previn, and an album of patriotic songs, "God Bless America." Her recordings of Barber's Hermit Songs, scenes from Antony and Cleopatra, and Knoxville: Summer of 1915, were brought together on a CD, Leontyne Price Sings Barber.

Late in her career, she recorded an album of Schubert and Strauss lieder for EMI, and, for Decca/London, an album of Verdi arias with the Israel Philharmonic, conducted by Zubin Mehta.

In 1996, RCA issued a limited-edition 11-CD boxed collection of Price's recordings, with an accompanying book, titled The Essential Leontyne Price.

Meanwhile, archival recordings of several important live performances have been released on CD. Deutsche Grammophon has issued Salzburg performances of "Missa Solemnis" (1959) and Il trovatore (1962), both conducted by Karajan. In 2002, RCA released a long-shelved tape of her 1965 Carnegie Hall recital debut in its "Rediscoveries" series. It includes a rare performance of Brahms' Zigeunerlieder.  In 2005, the complete Library of Congress recital with Samuel Barber was released, on Bridge, and includes her only recorded performance of Henri Sauguet's La Voyante, as well as songs by Poulenc and the world premiere of Barber's Hermit Songs. A 1952 broadcast of a Berlin performance of Porgy and Bess with Price and Warfield was discovered in the German radio archives and released on CD.

In 2011, Sony launched its series of historic live broadcasts from the Met with Il trovatore (1961) and Tosca (1962), both with Price and Corelli, and, the next year, added an Ernani (1962) with Price and Carlo Bergonzi. In 2017, a broadcast Aida (1967), with Bergonzi and Bumbry, was released separately and in a boxed set of live performances from the company's first season at Lincoln Center. The  set includes the opening night performance of Antony and Cleopatra.

The major roles in Price's repertoire that were never recorded in complete sets are Liu in Puccini'sTurandot and Donna Anna in Don Giovanni. For these, live performances are available. Price's Salzburg performances of Don Giovanni in 1960 and 1961, and a 1963 Vienna performance (with Fritz Wunderlich), all three under Karajan, are available on CD. Her Liu can be heard in a live Turandot from Vienna from 1961, on CD.

During the 1970s, RCA cut back on recording operas and recitals and much of Price's recital repertoire went unrecorded, including songs by Rachmaninoff, Poulenc, Respighi, Barber, Lee Hoiby, and Ned Rorem. A broadcast tape of the 1956 premiere of John La Montaine's cycle of songs, Songs of the Rose of Sharon, written for soprano and orchestra, has been found and posted on YouTube.

Among recent discoveries are a 1952 Juilliard performance of Falstaff, a Juilliard recital from 1951, and another recital given at Juilliard in 1955, Price's first year on the concert circuit. (The 1951 recital includes her only recording of Ravel's Scheherezade, with piano accompaniment.) All three were available on YouTube. Kinescopes of NBC Opera Theatre performances are locked in NBC vaults and have never been released on disc or videotape.

Discography
 Right As Rain (RCA – LSC-2983, 1967)
 A Salute to American Music (Richard Tucker Music Foundation Gala XVI, 1991)

Videography
 The Metropolitan Opera Centennial Gala, Deutsche Grammophon DVD, 00440-073-4538, 2009

Reception
In The Grand Tradition, a 1974 history of operatic recording, the British critic J.B. Steane writes that "one might conclude from recordings that [Price] is the best interpreter of Verdi of the century." The Russian soprano Galina Vishnevskaya remembered a 1963 Price performance of Tosca at the Vienna State Opera "left me with the strongest impression I have ever gotten from opera." In his 1983 autobiography, Plácido Domingo writes, "The power and sensuousness of Leontyne's voice were phenomenal—the most beautiful Verdi soprano I have ever heard."

The sopranos Renée Fleming, Kiri Te Kanawa, Jessye Norman, Leona Mitchell, Barbara Bonney, Sondra Radvanovsky, the mezzo-sopranos Janet Baker and Denyce Graves, bass-baritone José van Dam, and the countertenor David Daniels, spoke of Price as an inspiration.

Jazz musicians were impressed too. Miles Davis, in Miles: The Autobiography, writes: "Man, I love her as an artist. I love the way she sings Tosca. I wore out her recording of that, wore out two sets. Now, I might not do Tosca, but I loved the way Leontyne did it. I used to wonder how she would have sounded if she had sung jazz. She should be an inspiration for every musician, black or white. I know she is to me."

She has also had her critics. In his book The American Opera Singer, Peter G. Davis writes that Price had "a fabulous vocal gift that went largely unfulfilled," criticizing her reluctance to try new roles, her Tosca for its lack of a "working chest register", and her late Aidas for a "swooping" vocal line. Others criticized her lack of flexibility in coloratura, and her occasional mannerisms, including scooping or swooping up to high notes, gospel-style. Karajan took her to task for these during rehearsals for the 1977 Il trovatore, as Price herself related in an interview in Diva, by Helena Matheopoulos. In later recordings and appearances, she sang with a cleaner line.

Her acting, too, drew different responses over a long career. As Bess, she was praised for her dramatic fire and sensuality, and tapes of the early NBC Opera appearances demonstrate an appealing presence on camera. In her early years at the Met, she was often praised for her stage presence as well as her vocal skill.

In March 2007, on BBC Music Magazines list of the "20 All-time Best Sopranos" based on a poll of 21 British music critics and BBC presenters, Leontyne Price was ranked fourth, after Maria Callas, Joan Sutherland, and Victoria de los Ángeles.

References

Cited sources
Books

 
 

News and encyclopedia articles

Further reading
Books
 Sir Rudolf Bing, 5,000 Nights at the Opera: The Memoirs of Sir Rudolf Bing (Doubleday, 1972).
 Peter G. Davis, The American Opera Singer: The Lives and Adventures of America's Great Singers in Opera and Concert from 1825 to the Present (Anchor, 1999).
 Plácido Domingo, My First Forty Years (Alfred A. Knopf, 1983).
 Peter G. Davis, The American Opera Singer (Doubleday, 1997).
 Barbara B. Heyman, Samuel Barber, The Composer and His Music (Oxford University Press, 1992).
 Helena Matheopolous, Diva: Sopranos and Mezzo-sopranos Discuss Their Art (Northeastern University Press, 1992).

 Luciano Pavarotti with William Wright, Pavarotti, My Own Story (Doubleday, 1981), 

 Stephen Rubin, The New Met (MacMillan, 1974).
 Winthrop Sargeant, Divas (Coward, McCann, Geohegan, 1973).
 J. B. Steane, The Grand Tradition: Seventy Years of Singing on Record (Timber Press, 1993).
 Robert Vaughan, Herbert von Karajan (W.W. Norton & Company, 1986).
 Galina Vishnevskaya, Galina, A Russian Story (Harvest/HBJ Book, 1985).

 William Warfield, with Alton Miller, William Warfield: My Music and My Life (Sagamore Publishing, 1991).

Articles

External links

Metropolitan Opera Archives Database

1927 births
Living people
20th-century African-American women singers
20th-century American women opera singers
African-American women opera singers
American operatic sopranos
Central State University alumni
Delta Sigma Theta members
Grammy Lifetime Achievement Award winners
Juilliard School alumni
Kennedy Center honorees
People from Greenwich Village
People from Laurel, Mississippi
Presidential Medal of Freedom recipients
RCA Victor artists
Singers from Mississippi
Classical musicians from Mississippi
Spingarn Medal winners
United States National Medal of Arts recipients
21st-century American women
American Methodists